The outdoor gym is a gym built outside in a public park, with the all-weather construction of its exercise machines somewhat modeled on playground equipment.  It is similar to the 1960s–1970s proliferation of fitness trails, which continue to be created particularly in the US and Europe.  In some instances, trails used for fitness are referred to as outdoor gyms.

Types of outdoor gym equipment
Types of outdoor gym equipment may vary according to the nature of parks, locality and the visitors. There is no fixed list as which can include all of the machines or fixtures used in different parts of the world for outdoor recreation. These fixtures or machines can also be categorized into strength training and simple fitness or resistance training. Some basic outdoor exercising installations used commonly all over the world are pullup bars, balancing beams, parallel dip bars, etc.

By country

China 
Outdoor gyms have been used in China as a national fitness campaign prior to the 2008 Summer Olympics. In China they have a similar survey to the Active People Survey. The participation levels in physical activity have been steadily on the increase since the outdoor gym concept has been introduced to China..

India 
Outdoor gyms are starting to trend in New Delhi, India, where traditional gyms have had low popularity. In 2012 the New Delhi Municipal Council (NDMC) installed 40 sets around the area, surrounding municipalities have followed suit.

United Kingdom 
Since 2007, outdoor gyms have become increasingly common in the United Kingdom, where they are usually installed in public parks and school playgrounds.

See also 

 Chin-up bar
 Fitness trail
 Obstacle course
Outdoor fitness
 Calisthenics
 Parkour

References

External links 

 The world's best outdoor gyms,Outdoor sports equipment, Tatler

Physical exercise
Gyms
Outdoor structures
Urban design
Outdoor recreation